The British Rail Class 455 is an electric multiple unit passenger train built by BREL between 1982 and 1985. It is operated on suburban services in Greater London and Surrey by South Western Railway, as well as formerly by Southern.

Description
However, as the chopper control system at the time was not considered robust enough for the electrically rougher third rail Southern Region, they were fitted with a GEC Traction camshaft control systems instead. The Class 510 designation was changed to Class 455.

A total of 505 carriages were built by British Rail Engineering Limited's Holgate Road carriage works and together with 43 existing trailers from Class 508s, formed 137 four-car sets. They also allowed other stock to be cascaded to the North London and Oxted lines.

There were three batches of Class 455s, all consisting of four cars: driving trailer vehicles at each end, an intermediate trailer vehicle and an intermediate motorised vehicle (powered by four EE507-20J of 185 kW carried on the bogies of the MSO vehicle, some recovered from Class 405s), all originally built to the standard class 3+2 seating arrangement with 316 seats. Technically, they are formed DTSO+MSO+TSO+DTSO.

Class 455/8

The Class 455/8s were built between 1982 and 1984. These include all 46 units formerly operated by Southern (allocated to Stewarts Lane depot) and 28 allocated to South Western Railway (at Wimbledon depot).

The last day of service of the Southern Class 455/8s was 14 May 2022.

Class 455/7

The Class 455/7s were built in 1984–1985. There are 43 four-car units, all allocated to South Western Railway at Wimbledon depot. They differ from the 455/8s in having a revised front end (air horns relocated next to the coupler and revised headlamp clusters) that was later used on Class 317/2 and  units.

No new intermediate trailer (TSO) vehicles were produced for this subclass; instead, they use redundant TSO vehicles that had been removed from  units prior to those units being transferred to Merseyrail in Liverpool. The reused vehicles can be recognised by their shorter and wider profile compared to 'normal' Class 455 vehicles.

Class 455/9
The Class 455/9s were built in 1985, and all 20 units are allocated to South Western Railway at Wimbledon depot. These are similar to the 455/7s, except that they had new-build TSOs.

In connection with the Crossrail project, which was rejected in 1994, two trailer cars (71731 from unit 5918; 71732 from unit 5919) were modified to take plug doors. Both were coupled and ran in service in this condition. After an extended period in service, it was found that the modifications had slightly weakened the overall structure. 71732 was re-fitted with sliding doors but 71731 was removed from service, remaining at Eastleigh Works to be cannibalised for spare parts. The latter car served as a demonstrator for the South West Trains refurbished full red livery until it was scrapped in 2005.

Two units later gained replacement carriages that had originally been part of the prototype  DEMU, which had the same bodyshell. 455912's TSO was replaced by 67400.  455913's MSO 62838, which had been crushed by a cement mixer lorry falling off a bridge, was replaced with 67301, which had originally been a Class 210 DTSO and was later a DMSO in the experimental . The undamaged end of 62838 was used to replace the former cab end of 67301; the remainder of 62838 was scrapped.

Operations

Current operations

South West Trains / South Western Railway
In February 1996, all South Western division 455s were transferred to South West Trains (SWT). From September 1996, SWT began to modify the Network SouthEast livery with a Stagecoach orange brand added. In November 2004, SWT took delivery of the first unit refurbished by Bombardier, Ashford. The work involved replacing the original seats with high-back Grammar seats (similar to those fitted to  units) in 2+2 configuration, modifying the doorways so that the sliding doors can open further, and the repainting of the units in a new predominantly-red livery. The last was completed in March 2008.

In April 2013 it was announced that the SWT units would be fitted with a new alternating current traction system provided by Vossloh Kiepe. The project works commenced in June 2014 and involved replacing the original pneumatically-actuated camshaft control system with a solid-state insulated-gate bipolar transistor (IGBT) inverter and variable-voltage/variable-frequency (VVVF) drive, and exchanging the as-built English Electric DC traction motors with new AC units. The upgraded units also received new Knorr-Bremse brake controllers, which allows regenerative braking in addition to the existing rheostatic function.

The new traction motors are each  lighter than the DC originals, and the traction system upgrade as a whole improves reliability and reduces overall operating and maintenance costs.

Additionally, as the upgrade reduced the amount of time Class 455 units spent being inspected and serviced in depots, South West Trains were able to proceed with the introduction of new  units without needing to acquire more depot space.

All units passed to South Western Railway with the South Western franchise change in August 2017. They are used on most London commuter rail routes from London Waterloo to South West London and neighbouring areas.

Former operations

British Rail
Deliveries commenced in 1982 to Strawberry Hill. On 16 November 1982, 455805 was unveiled at Waterloo station. The first entered service on 28 March 1983. All were initially allocated to Wimbledon Depot working services on the Central and South Western divisions. The Central Division 455/8s were transferred to Selhurst in 1986 after modifications to the depot were completed. All were delivered in British Rail blue and grey livery; it had been anticipated that some or all 455/9s would be painted in a green variant of the 'Jaffa Cake' London & SouthEast livery, but this was overruled by the BR Design Panel. From 1986 all 455s were progressively repainted in Network SouthEast white, blue and red livery. In May 1991, 455743 was renumbered 455750 and renamed Wimbledon Traincare Depot in recognition of the depot obtaining BS5750 quality services accreditation.

In April 1994 in the lead up to the privatisation of British Rail, 455801-455846 were allocated to the Network SouthCentral shadow franchise and sold to Eversholt. The remainder were allocated to the South West Trains shadow franchise and sold to Porterbrook.

Connex South Central / Southern

 
On 13 October 1996, the Network SouthCentral shadow franchise was taken over by Connex South Central with 455801-455846. In the late 1990s, 16 were repainted in Connex's white and yellow livery. In August 2001, the franchise passed to Southern with all 46 transferred. Some were repainted in Southern's white and green livery. Between February 2004 and February 2006, all were refurbished by Alstom, Eastleigh.

A refurbishment programme started for the Southern units in June 2012. This included a repaint and interior changes, such as changes to the grab rails on the top between each door. 455808 was the first completed, followed by 455812 in August 2012. The project was completed in December 2013, 455801 being the last unit.

Another refurbishment programme begun in January 2018 for the 455s to become compliant with the PRM 2020 specifications with 455816 being the first one completed.

Southern Class 455 units were used on inner and outer suburban services out of London to destinations in South London and Surrey, before being withdrawn in May 2022. They will not be directly replaced, as the new timetable will be operated by Southern's Class 377 EMUs. A farewell tour for the Southern Class 455 units took place on 14 May 2022.

The first pair of Southern class 455s (455838 and 455839) were sent for scrap on 4 May 2022.

Accidents and incidents
Unit 5802 then collided with 5820.
 2010 Oxshott rail accident: On 5 November 2010, a concrete mixer went over the edge of a bridge over the railway line near Oxshott station, landing on the 15:05 South West Trains service from Guildford railway station to London Waterloo. The train was formed of two Class 455 units, 455741 and 455913. The end of the roof of the sixth carriage was severely crushed. Further damage was sustained to the fifth, sixth, seventh and eighth carriages, with the latter being derailed at its trailing bogie, although the train remained upright. The lorry driver and one passenger suffered serious injuries; a further five passengers suffered minor injuries. Unit 455913 was repaired at Wolverton railway works, at a cost of £1.6 million, and returned to service in July 2013. It was also fitted with an ex  driving vehicle which has been converted to an intermediate vehicle whilst retaining its existing number of 67301. Original vehicle 62838 was damaged beyond repair in the accident and was scrapped.
 On 7 July 2017, an explosion occurred in an underframe equipment case of unit 455901 at Guildford station. No injuries occurred. The cause of the explosion was a faulty capacitor which had been fitted when the units' electrical equipment was upgraded. A manufacturing defect in the new traction equipment has caused three failures in service and five under test. Two of the failures in service involved unit 455726, the other involved unit 455901. In the most serious incident, on 7 July 2017, fragments, described as "quite sizeable" by the Rail Accident Investigation Branch, were scattered across platforms and an adjacent car park at Guildford station.
 On 15 August 2017, two Class 455 units formed part of a train with Class 456 unit 456015 which was derailed at London Waterloo. The cause of the accident was errors made in the wiring of the signalling during work to increase capacity at Waterloo. Neither of the Class 455 units was damaged.

Future
South Western Railway had intended to replace their fleet with Class 701 Aventra units from 2019; however this was initially deferred to mid-2020 and has been deferred again to 2021. The Class 701 Aventra EMUs are planned to enter service in 2023.

Fleet details

Notes

References

Further reading

External links 

 Class 455 - South Western Railway

455
455
Train-related introductions in 1982
750 V DC multiple units